Nathan Keyes, born Nathan William Gumke, (born November 28, 1985) is an American actor, known for his roles as Kevin Levin in Ben 10: Alien Swarm and Ansel in Maya Dardel.

Life and career 
Keyes was born in Washington, D.C., to Holly and Dale Gumke, but raised in York, Pennsylvania with younger brother Chris. When he was seven, he wrote, produced, directed and acted in a play based on The Tailor of Gloucester. He played his first stage role when he was eleven, and went on to star in theatrical roles such as Romeo, in Romeo and Juliet, the Scarecrow in The Wizard of Oz, the Emcee in Cabaret, and Albert in Bye, Bye Birdie. He also starred in Bang Bang, You're Dead, a play about school violence, presented in high schools in York County, Pennsylvania. Keyes attended York Suburban High School. In 2000, he founded the pop band "As 1", performing in more than seventy-five concerts throughout the northeast.

After graduating in 2004, Keyes moved to Los Angeles, where he started working as graphic designer and photographer of CD covers. Meanwhile, he studied acting with coach Stephanie Feury. He landed a recurring role on ABC Family's Three Moons Over Milford, and has guest starred on shows like CBS's Numb3rs and ABC's No Ordinary Family. In 2009, he joined the cast of the movie Ben 10: Alien Swarm, portraiting Kevin Levin.

Filmography

References

External links

Living people
American male television actors
21st-century American male actors
1985 births